Salvia clusii is the binomial name ambiguously used to describe several different sage plants:
Salvia pratensis
Salvia triloba
Salvia officinalis

clusii